Tone Float is the only LP by the German band Organisation zur Verwirklichung gemeinsamer Musikkonzepte (Organisation.)  Organisation was a predecessor to Kraftwerk, which was formed by two members of the band, Ralf Hütter and Florian Schneider-Esleben, after the album's release.

Recording and release
The album was produced by Konrad "Conny" Plank.  Of the album's recording, Hütter would later say:

Sales were poor and RCA opted to drop the band, which then dissolved following the departure of Hütter and Schneider-Esleben to Kraftwerk.

The album has never been officially reissued, although bootleg CDs, LPs and cassettes appeared since the 1990s. These often included a bonus audio-track, erroneously titled Vor dem blauen Bock, which in fact is an instrumental track named Rückstoß Gondoliere, from a 22 May 1971 performance by Kraftwerk on the Bremen Beat-Club TV show.  This song features the short-lived line-up of Florian Schneider, Michael Rother and Klaus Dinger (Ralf Hütter had left the group during this period to study architecture). Rother and Dinger left Kraftwerk shortly afterwards to form Neu!.

In 2021, the album was unofficially rereleased on digital services under the name Tone Float Beat-Club 1971, along with a new album cover by record label Media Champ. This release additionally includes, and correctly names, Rückstoß Gondoliere.

Track listing

Personnel
 Basil Hammoudi – glockenspiel, conga gong, musical box, bongos, percussion, vocals
 Butch Hauf – bass, shaky tube, small bells, plastic hammer, percussion
 Ralf Hütter – Hammond organ, organ
 Alfred "Fred" Mönicks – drums, bongos, maracas, cowbell, tambourine
 Florian Schneider-Esleben – electric flute, alto flute, bell, triangle, tambourine, electro-violin, percussion

Additional personnel
 Konrad "Conny" Plank – sound engineering

Release details

References

External links
 

Organisation (band) albums
1970 debut albums
Albums produced by Conny Plank
RCA Records albums